Mehar Bano is a Pakistani actress. She has played the role of Umama in social-drama Daagh for which she received a nomination for Best Actress at Lux Style Awards. She also played the roles of Batool in ARY Digital's Balaa (2018) and Anoushay in Mere Paas Tum Ho (2019)

Career
She started her arts career while studying at National College of Arts (NCA)
Bano is known for her work in Television dramas. She has played the lead role of Umama in ARY Digital's Daagh (2012) for which she was nominated for Best Television Actress at the 13th Lux Style Awards. She further appeared in a leading role in Miss Fire (2013),  Uff Yeh Mohabbat (2014) and Bunty I love You (2014).

Her other appearances include DANCING  Mor Mahal, Lashkara, Balaa. In 2018, she made her film debut with Motorcycle Girl. She has established her dancing and theatre institute at Karachi namely "Sway Dance Project" where training is given to young people regarding acting and dancing.

Filmography

Television

Web Series/Films

References

External links

21st-century Pakistani actresses
Pakistani female models
Pakistani television actresses
Living people
1994 births